Elijah Doro Muala (20 January 1960 – 16 February 2021) was a Solomon Islands politician.

Following a secondary school education, he worked as an accountant.

His career in national politics began when he was elected to the  Parliament of Solomon Islands as the member for South Choiseul in the August 2010 general election, standing for the National Party. He was then appointed Minister for Commerce, Industries, Labour & Immigration  in Prime Minister Danny Philip's Cabinet. When Gordon Darcy Lilo replaced Philip as Prime Minister in November 2011, Muala retained his position in government. Muala was re-elected to the National Parliament of Solomon Islands for South Choiseul Constituency on 19 November 2014. However he lost reelection in the 3 April 2019 National General Election.

References

1960 births
2021 deaths
Members of the National Parliament of the Solomon Islands
People from Choiseul Province
Government ministers of the Solomon Islands
Accountants
Labor ministers
Commerce and industry ministers
Immigration ministers